Gobiomorphus is a genus of fishes in the family Eleotridae native to New Zealand and Australia. They are typically small, benthic fishes with large, rounded fins and two dorsal fins. Many have an amphidromous lifecycle: the eggs are laid in fresh water, but the fry are dispersed to sea soon after hatching, and grow there for several months before returning to fresh water.

Species
The recognized species in this genus are:
 Gobiomorphus alpinus (Stokell, 1962) (Tarndale bully)
 Gobiomorphus australis (Krefft, 1864) (striped gudgeon)
 Gobiomorphus basalis (Gray, 1842) (Cran's bully)
 Gobiomorphus breviceps (Stokell, 1939) (upland bully)
 Gobiomorphus cotidianus (McDowall, 1975) (common bully)
 Gobiomorphus coxii (Krefft, 1864) (Cox's gudgeon)
 Gobiomorphus gobioides (Valenciennes, 1837) (giant bully)
 Gobiomorphus hubbsi (Stokell, 1959) (bluegill bully)
 Gobiomorphus huttoni (Ogilby, 1894) (redfin bully)

References

 
Taxa named by Theodore Gill 
Freshwater fish genera